Adriana González-Peñas (30 March 1986) is a Spanish former professional tennis player. She was French Open girls’ doubles champions 2003 with her compatriot Marta Fraga.

As a professional, her career-high WTA rankings are 328 in singles and 313 in doubles.
In her career, González-Peñas won four singles and nine doubles titles on the ITF Women's Circuit.

ITF finals

Singles: 9 (4–5)

Doubles: 12 (9–3)

Sources

External links
 
 

Spanish female tennis players
1986 births
Living people
French Open junior champions
Grand Slam (tennis) champions in girls' doubles
Tennis players from Catalonia